The Gazzetta di Milano (also known as the Gazzetta privilegiata di Milano from 1830 to 1848) was an Italian newspaper published in Milan from 1816 until 1875.  It was the official newspaper of the Kingdom of Lombardy–Venetia (a domain of the Austrian Empire) from 1816 until 1859. Its first editor was the Venetian author and critic . After his death in 1831, it was run for two years by his son, Giovanni Giacomo Pezzi (1805–1869) who went on to found the journal Glissons n'appuyons pas.

With the annexation of Lombardy by the Kingdom of Sardinia in 1859, the Gazzetta ceased to be an official newspaper. It was then run by a consortium of four of its writers which included the novelist and critic Giuseppe Rovani. Increasingly in financial difficulty, it ceased publication in 1875. It had been acquired by Edoardo Sonzogno the previous year and was then absorbed by Sonzogno's paper .

References

1816 establishments in Italy
1875 disestablishments in Italy
Italian-language newspapers
Newspapers published in Milan
Defunct daily newspapers
Defunct newspapers published in Italy
Publications established in 1816
Daily newspapers published in Italy